Harry Frauca (14 October 1928 – 1986) was an Australian naturalist, writer and photographer.  Of  Catalan origin, he was born in Spain and educated in Denmark and England. He moved to Australia in the 1950s and became an Australian citizen. From 1960 he became a full-time writer and photographer on natural history, contributing with his wife to such publications as Walkabout.  From 1970 he collected insects for the Australian National Insect Collection. The last years of his life were spent in Bundaberg, Queensland with his wife Claudia. He died in 1979.

He has been honoured in the name of the Harry Frauca Walkway, a  walkway at Baldwin Swamp, Bundaberg, as well as the Harry Frauca Walking Track and Harry Frauca Information Panel at the Mount Walsh National Park, Biggenden.

Bibliography
As well as articles in Walkabout and elsewhere, books authored or coauthored by Frauca include:
 n.d. (c.1950) - In a New Country. Paterson Brokensha: Perth.
 1963 - Encounters with Australian Animals. William Heinemann Ltd: Melbourne. (With Claudy Frauca).
 1965 - The Book of Australian Wild Life. Heinemann: London.
 1966 - Harry Frauca's Book of Reptiles. Jacaranda: Brisbane.
 1967 - Birds from the Seas, Swamps and Scrubs of Australia. William Heinemann Ltd: Melbourne.
 1968 - Harry Frauca's Book of Insects. Jacaranda: Brisbane.
 1969 - Striped Wolf. A Bush Adventure. Heinemann: Melbourne.
 1970 - A Pictorial Encyclopaedia of Australian Wildlife. Periwinkle Books. (With Claudy Frauca).
 1971 - Animal Behaviour. Periwinkle Books.
 1971 - Australian Bush Birds. Lansdowne Press: Melbourne.
 1973 - Australian Insect Wonders. Rigby: Australia. (With Densey Clyne).
 1974 - Australian Bird Wonders. Rigby: Australia.
 1974 - Australian Insects. Australian Universities Press.
 1974 - Australian Reptiles. Australian Universities Press.
 1974 – The Echidna. Lansdowne Press: Melbourne. (With Barbara Burton).
 1974 – Kangaroo: the unknown quantity. Sungravure: Sydney.
 1976 - Adventures with Australian Animals. Rigby: Australia.
 1977 - The Australian Bush in Colour. Ure Smith. (With Claudy Frauca).
 1977 - In Praise of Australian Birds. Rigby: Adelaide.
 1978 - Bushwalking: a Guide to Bushcraft. Murray Book Distributors: Sydney.
 1980 - The Australian Bird Spotter's Book. The behaviour of birds in their natural landscapes. Reed: Sydney.
 1980 - Pack Manual of Tracks, Signs and Nests. Reed: Sydney.
 1981 – Native Birds of Australia. Pan Macmillan. (With Susan Drury).
 1982 - What animal is that?: a guide to Australian amphibians, insects, mammals, reptiles and spiders. Reed: Sydney.
 1983 – Birds of Australia. Currey O'Neil: Melbourne.

References

Australian naturalists
Australian nature writers
Australian photographers
1928 births
1986 deaths
Spanish emigrants to Australia
20th-century Australian zoologists